Circobotys arrogantalis is a moth in the family Crambidae. It was described by Tams in 1927. It is found in China (Sichuan).

References

Moths described in 1927
Pyraustinae